John Greenwood may refer to:

Sportspeople
 John Greenwood (cricketer, born 1851) (1851–1935), English cricketer
 John Eric Greenwood (1891–1975), rugby union international who represented England
 John Greenwood (footballer) (1921–1994), English footballer
 Jack Greenwood (footballer) (born 1943), Australian footballer of the 1960s
 John Greenwood (racing driver) (1945–2015), American driver and co-founder of Greenwood Corvettes

Others
 John Greenwood (divine) (1556–1593), Puritan divine
 John Greenwood (educator) (died 1609), English schoolmaster
 John Greenwood (cartographer) (fl. 1821–1840), and his brother Christopher, cartographer and publisher
 John Greenwood (dentist) (1760–1819), George Washington's dentist and the "father of modern dentistry"
 John D. H. Greenwood (1889–1975), English composer of classical and film music
 John Greenwood (artist) (1727–1792), colonial American artist
 John Greenwood (bus operator) (1788–1851), transport entrepreneur from Salford
 John Greenwood (executive) (1950–2008), British catering executive
 John Greenwood (surgeon), Australian surgeon
 John Greenwood (Australian politician) (born 1934), member of the Queensland Legislative Assembly
 John Greenwood (MP) (1821–1874), British Member of the UK Parliament for Ripon
 John Greenwood (lawyer) (1800–1871), English lawyer and cricketer

See also
 Jonathan Greenwood (born 1968), British businessman
 Jonny Greenwood (born 1971), English musician and composer
 Johnny Greenwood (singer) (born 1939), Australian country music singer
 John Buxton Hilton (1921–1986), British crime writer, who also wrote as 'John Greenwood'